The Joint Operation Arvand (more known by its Persian acronym AMA) was a show of force operation orchestrated in April 1969 by the Imperial Iranian Armed Forces following Iraqi claim for the sovereign right to Shatt al-Arab/Arvand Rud and threatening to block passage of vessels unless they fly the Iraqi flag.

On 22 April 1969, Iranian merchant ship Ebn-e-Sina, carrying a cargo of steel beams and flying Iranian flag, was escorted by Iranian heavily armed naval vessels, as well as jet fighters and proceeded through the river into the Persian Gulf, in an 80-mile journey which took about six hours. However, the Iraqi forces did not attempt to respond as it pledged.

Both countries strengthened their land forces along the river bank, stationing artillery, tanks and anti-aircraft weapons. Iranian troops were positioned in the vicinity of Khorramshahr and Abadan, while Iraq put its forces in Basra on alert. Iranian freighter Arya Far passed through the river escorted by four gunboats three days later, with no disturbance.

As a result, Iraq expelled thousands of Iranian residents and pilgrims from its soil, banned import of Iranian goods, and began supporting separatists in Khuzestan and Balochistan.

References 

Wars involving Iran
Wars involving Iraq
Iran–Iraq relations
20th-century conflicts
Conflicts in 1969
1969 in Iran